Red Willow Dam (National ID # NE01076) is a dam in Frontier County, Nebraska, about ten miles northwest of McCook.

The earthen dam was constructed from 1960 to 1962 by the United States Bureau of Reclamation, with a height of 126 feet.  It impounds Willow Creek for flood control, part of the Frenchman-Cambridge Division of the Bureau's extensive Pick–Sloan Missouri Basin Program.  The dam is owned and operated by the Bureau.

The reservoir it creates, Hugh Butler Lake, has a water surface of 1,629 acres, 4,461 land acres, about 35 miles of shoreline, and a maximum water capacity of 86,630 acre-feet.  Recreation includes fishing (for walleye, crappie, white bass, channel catfish, and wipers, etc.), hunting, boating, camping and hiking.  The shore borders Nebraska's Red Willow Reservoir State Recreation Area.

References 

Dams in Nebraska
Reservoirs in Nebraska
United States Bureau of Reclamation dams
Buildings and structures in Frontier County, Nebraska
Earth-filled dams
Dams completed in 1962
Bodies of water of Frontier County, Nebraska